Ash Grove bus garage is a bus garage in Hackney, East London. It is located on the Mare Street, where it crosses the Regent's Canal. The depot is occupied by two companies, Arriva London and Stagecoach London, and holds around thirty buses. Opened in 1981 by London Buses, it was closed in 1991 following the abandonment of the London Forest subsidiary, but reopened in 1994 by Kentish Bus. East Thames Buses have also used the site.

History

Ash Grove is one of three new garages opened in 1981 by London Buses at a cost of £3.5 million. It had space for 140 buses undercover and a further 30 in the yard. The roof was unusual in being carried by ten 35-ton triangular trusses, said to be the largest in the UK, supported on reinforced concrete columns. The garage assumed Hackney's operation of Red Arrow routes 502 and 513 using new Leyland Nationals which had been stored at the garage, and the entire Hackney and Dalston allocations. When London Buses was split into eleven separate companies Ash Grove became part of the London Forest operation, but closed in 1991 when London Forest was wound up.

1990s
The garage was re-opened in 1994 by Kentish Bus. This came about after then gained a small number of routes in the Leyton area, including former Boro'line route 108, although they referred to the garage as Cambridge Heath.

Ash Grove was also used at various times to house stored vehicles for the London Transport Museum.

2000s

Ash Grove re-opened again in 2000 for use by the London Buses company East Thames Buses which took over the former Harris Bus routes after that company ran into financial difficulties. Although East Thames Buses have now moved to new premises at Mandela Way, CT Plus moved into the garage yard to house its routes won in the London area. CT Plus use the garage to stable vehicles for routes 153, 212, 385, 388, 394, 812, W12, W13 and 675.

Arriva London used the depot as the base for their new Mercedes-Benz Citaro articulated buses for route 38 following the conversion from AEC Routemasters in November 2005. This has ended following the route's conversion back to double-deck operation, but routes 78 and 168 have been transferred to operate from the garage.

Industrial relations
The garage has suffered from a number of industrial relations difficulties in its history. In 1991 London Forest won a group of eleven tendered routes in the Walthamstow area on the basis of very low prices. This led to the company proposing a pay cut of around 18% to all staff, which saw staff at all of its four garages strike. Following these events the company was wound up and the garage closed.

In June 2008 forty CT Plus employees based at the garage protested against the dismissal of a shop steward who had refused to drive a bus with a health and safety defect. October 2010 saw strike action by CT Plus workers in a dispute over pay, although most services were not disrupted significantly.

References

External links

Buildings and structures in the London Borough of Hackney
Bus garages in London
Transport infrastructure completed in 1981